Jainab binti Ahmad or better known as Jainab Ahmad Ayid (born 22 July 1953) is a Malaysian politician who served as the State Minister of Community Development and Consumer Affairs from May 2013 to May 2018. She served as the Member of Sabah State Legislative Assembly (MLA) for Karambunai from March 2004 to May 2018. She is a member of the United Malays National Organisation (UMNO) a component party of the Barisan Nasional (BN) coalition.

Election results

Honours 
 :
  Commander of the Order of Kinabalu (PGDK) - Datuk (2008)

References 

1953 births
Living people
United Malays National Organisation politicians
Members of the Sabah State Legislative Assembly
Commanders of the Order of Kinabalu